The Bishop House in Casper, Wyoming was built in 1907.  It was listed on the National Register of Historic Places in 2001.

Description
The Bishop House is a -story foursquare house in Casper, Wyoming. It was built in 1907 in the Colonial Revival style and features a widow's walk. The home's red exterior bricks were shipped from Denver. A full porch, supported by four Tuscan columns, extends across the front of the house.

History
The Bishop House was the first multi-storied brick home in Casper, Wyoming. Built in the city's Capitol Hill addition, the home was constructed for Marvin Lord Bishop, Sr., and was based on his childhood home in the Shenandoah Valley of Virginia. Its architect was Elias N. Miller of Denver, and its builder was William T. Evans, for whom Evansville, Wyoming is named.

After M. L. Bishop died in 1939, his wife, Leona, continued to live in the residence until her death in 1948. Their youngest daughter, Lucile L. Bishop, lived in the Bishop House from 1908 to her death in 1997. In 2001, the structure was placed on the National Register of Historic Places. The home is now owned by the Cadoma Foundation and used for community events.

References

External links
 Cadoma Foundation official site
 Bishop House at the Wyoming State Historic Preservation Office

Colonial Revival architecture in Wyoming
Buildings and structures in Casper, Wyoming
Houses completed in 1907
Houses on the National Register of Historic Places in Wyoming
Houses in Natrona County, Wyoming
National Register of Historic Places in Natrona County, Wyoming